Live & Swingin': The Ultimate Rat Pack Collection is a 2003 album compiling songs by Frank Sinatra, Dean Martin, and Sammy Davis Jr.

Disc one is a compact disc compiling live performances at a Chicago nightclub between November 26 and December 2, 1962 (over half of which was previously unreleased). Disc two is a 90-minute DVD featuring never-before-issued footage of a St. Louis performance from the mid-1960s with a young Johnny Carson emceeing.

Reception

The Allmusic review by Richie Unterberger awarded the album four and a half stars. "How much you like this sort of thing depends almost as much on how much you like the celebrity sleaze-kitsch that the Rat Pack mythology was built upon as you do the trio's estimable vocal abilities," Unterberger states, "But both parts deliver all the all-around entertainment you'd expect."

Track listing (CD)
 "Fanfare and Introduction", Frank Sinatra, Dean Martin and Sammy Davis Jr.
 Medley: "Drink to Me Only with Thine Eyes"/"When You're Smiling"/"The Lady Is a Tramp", Dean Martin
 "I Left My Heart in San Francisco", Dean Martin
 "I'm Gonna Sit Right Down and Write Myself a Letter", Dean Martin
 Medley: "Volare"/"On an Evening in Roma", Dean Martin
 "Goody Goody", Frank Sinatra
 "Chicago", Frank Sinatra
 "When Your Lover Has Gone", Frank Sinatra
 Monologue, Frank Sinatra
 "Please Be Kind", Frank Sinatra
 "You're Nobody till Somebody Loves You", Frank Sinatra
 "What Kind of Fool Am I?", Sammy Davis Jr.
 "Out of This World", Sammy Davis Jr.
 "She's Funny That Way", Sammy Davis Jr.
 "Hey There", Sammy Davis Jr.
 Comedy, Frank Sinatra and Dean Martin
 Medley 1: "Brazil"/"You Are Too Beautiful"/"Cecilia (Does Your Mother ...)", Frank Sinatra and Dean Martin
 Medley 2: "I Can't Give You Anything but Love, Baby"/"Too Marvelous for Words", Frank Sinatra and Dean Martin
 "Impressions", Frank Sinatra, Dean Martin and Sammy Davis Jr.
 "The Birth of the Blues", Frank Sinatra, Dean Martin and Sammy Davis Jr.
 Danny Thomas Introduction, Frank Sinatra, Dean Martin and Sammy Davis Jr.
 "Nancy (With the Laughing Face)", Frank Sinatra
 "Me and My Shadow", Frank Sinatra and Sammy Davis Jr.
 "Sam's Song", Sammy Davis Jr.and Dean Martin
 "The Birth of the Blues (Reprise)", Frank Sinatra, Dean Martin and Sammy Davis Jr.

Track listing (DVD)
 Johnny Carson Monologue
 "Send Me the Pillow That You Dream On", Dean Martin
 "King of the Road", Dean Martin
 "Everybody Loves Somebody", Dean Martin
 Medley: "Volare"/"On an Evening in Roma", Dean Martin
 "You're Nobody Till Somebody Loves You", Dean Martin
 "My Shining Hour", Sammy Davis Jr.
 "Who Can I Turn To (When Nobody Needs Me)", Sammy Davis Jr.
 "I've Got You Under My Skin", Sammy Davis Jr.
 "You Came a Long Way from St. Louis", Sammy Davis Jr.
 "You Are My Sunshine", Sammy Davis Jr.
 "Bee-Bom", Sammy Davis Jr.
 "One for My Baby", Sammy Davis Jr.
 "Get Me to the Church on Time", Frank Sinatra
 "Fly Me to the Moon", Frank Sinatra
 "Luck Be a Lady", Frank Sinatra
 "I Only Have Eyes for You", Frank Sinatra
 "I've Got You Under My Skin", Frank Sinatra
 "Please Be Kind", Frank Sinatra
 "You Make Me Feel So Young", Frank Sinatra
 "My Kind of Town", Frank Sinatra
 "Happy Birthday", Frank Sinatra, Dean Martin and Sammy Davis Jr.
 "Birth of the Blues", Frank Sinatra, Dean Martin and Sammy Davis Jr.

Personnel
 Sammy Davis Jr. - vocals
 Frank Sinatra - vocals
 Dean Martin - vocals
 Johnny Carson - emcee

References

Dean Martin albums
2003 compilation albums
Compilation albums published posthumously
Collaborative albums
Frank Sinatra compilation albums